"Bad" is a song by English singer-songwriter James Bay. The song was released by Republic Records on 10 May 2019, through digital download and streaming formats. In May 2019, Bay performed the track live on The Late Show with Stephen Colbert.

A live version was released on 7 June 2019.

Music video
The music video for "Bad" was directed by Martin Landgrave and released on 27 June 2019. In the clip, Bay is sitting on a chair, playing guitar, as he floats through New York City. He sings the lyrics as he travels from Central Park to Times Square.

Track listing
Digital download
"Bad" – 3:45

Digital download
"Bad" (Live at Round Chapel, London) – 3:54

Charts

References

2019 songs
2019 singles
James Bay (singer) songs
Republic Records singles
Songs written by James Bay (singer)
Songs written by Dan Wilson (musician)
Song recordings produced by Dan Wilson (musician)